The Volunteers may refer to:

The Volunteers (play), a 1692 comedy by Thomas Shadwell
The Volunteers, a Korean band with lead singer Yerin Baek
The Volunteers, a Norwegian band with lead singer Sivert Høyem
The Volunteers, a 2004 album by Jonah Matranga recording as onelinedrawing
The Volunteers, a musical farce about the Whiskey Rebellion, by Susanna Rowson
Tennessee Volunteers, the sports teams of the University of Tennessee

See also
Volunteer (disambiguation)